Panicum queenslandicum a species of monocotyledon described by Karel Domin. Panicum queenslandicum belongs to the genus Panicum, and the family Poaceae. No subspecies are listed. The species is native to the Maluku Islands, New Guinea and the Australian states of New South Wales, Queensland and Victoria.

Description 
P. queenslandicum is a perennial grass that grows densely in clusters/tufts, reaching heights of up to 0.8 m high.

References 

Panicum
Flora of the Maluku Islands
Flora of New South Wales
Flora of Queensland
Flora of Victoria (Australia)
Flora of New Guinea